Montes Azules Biosphere Reserve is a protected natural area in Chiapas state of southern Mexico. The reserve protects 3312 km2 of the Lacandon Jungle, a lowland tropical rainforest.

Geography
Montes Azules Biosphere reserve adjoins Lacan-Tun Biosphere Reserve on the east, and is bounded by the Lacantun River, a tributary of the Usumacinta, on the south.

Flora and fauna
The reserve contains 500 species of trees.

More than 390 species of birds have been recorded in the reserve, almost half of all known species in Mexico. There are 116 species of mammals present, including the white-lipped peccary (Tayassu pecari) and northern tamandua (Tamandua mexicana). Native reptiles include Morelet's crocodile (Crocodylus moreletii).

Conservation
Historically the forest was exploited for chicle and mahogany. The reserve is currently threatened by timber cutting and people setting fire to the forest to clear areas for cattle raising and farming.

References

Biosphere reserves of Mexico
Protected areas of Chiapas
Petén–Veracruz moist forests
Chiapas montane forests